Palmetto Point is a prominent headland that marks the southwesternmost point of the Caribbean island of Barbuda. It lies due south of Codrington Lagoon and separates the west and south coasts of the island. A martello tower stands 2 km to the northeast.

References
Miller, D. (ed.) (2005) Caribbean Islands. (4th edition). Footscray, VIC: Lonely Planet.
Scott, C. R. (ed.) (2005) Insight guide: Caribbean (5th edition). London: Apa Publications.

Headlands of Antigua and Barbuda
Geography of Barbuda